Lake Rosseau/John's Bay Water Aerodrome  is located  west  of Windermere, Ontario, Canada.

See also
 Windermere Airport
 Lake Rosseau/Arthurlie Bay Water Aerodrome
 Lake Rosseau/Morgan Bay Water Aerodrome
 Lake Rosseau/Windermere Water Aerodrome

References

Registered aerodromes in Ontario
Seaplane bases in Ontario
Transport in the District Municipality of Muskoka